Vashki is the name of several rural localities in Russia:
Vashki, Novosokolnichesky District, Pskov Oblast, a village in Novosokolnichesky District, Pskov Oblast
Vashki, Pytalovsky District, Pskov Oblast, a village in Pytalovsky District, Pskov Oblast
Vashki, Vologda Oblast, a village in Vasilyevsky Selsoviet of Vashkinsky District of Vologda Oblast